The  Pittsburgh Gladiators season was the third season for the Arena Football League franchise.

Regular season

Schedule

Standings

y – clinched regular-season title

x – clinched playoff spot

Playoffs

Roster

Awards

References

External links
 1989 Pittsburgh Gladiators season at arenafan.com

Pittsburgh Gladiators
Tampa Bay Storm seasons
Pittsburgh Gladiators